The following is a list of notable Ann Arborites (people born in or associated with the city of Ann Arbor, Michigan). Note that it does not include people associated with Ann Arbor only as students or alumni of the University of Michigan.

Activists and advocates
Keith Hefner, activist

Artists

Virgil Exner, automobile designer
Fred Gallagher, cartoonist
Gerome Kamrowski, abstract painter
Terry LaBan, cartoonist
Benjamin McCready, portrait painter
Irving Kane Pond, architect
Anna Sui, fashion designer
Timothy Van Laar, painter
Leo Zulueta, tattoo artist

Athletes and sports figures

Kole Ayi, NFL player
Aaron Bailey, NFL wide receiver
Charles A. Baird (c. 1870–1944), first UM athletic director
Chris Ballingall, baseball player
Evan Bates, figure skater
Keith Bostic, NFL defensive back
Rebecca Bross, artistic gymnast
Ian Cole, NHL hockey player
Andrew Copp, NHL Hockey player
Fritz Crisler (1899–1982), football coach
Ali Curtis, professional soccer player
Ken Dyer, NFL player
Bunny Fabrique , was a professional baseball player who played shortstop for the 1916–1917 Brooklyn Robins.
Alison Gregorka, water polo player, Olympic silver medalist
Francie Kraker Goodridge, track and field, first Michigan-born woman on U.S. Olympic team 
Eliot Halverson, figure skater
Jim Harbaugh, NFL quarterback and coach
John Harbaugh, NFL coach
Danielle Hartsell, pair skater, sister of Steve Hartsell
Steve Hartsell, pair skater, brother of Danielle Hartsell
Howdy Holmes, race driver
Keiffer Hubbell, figure skater
Madison Hubbell, figure skater
Zeke Jones, wrestling coach, Olympic silver medalist
Steven Kampfer, professional hockey player
Hobbs Kessler, professional runner for Adidas
Bruce Kimball, Olympic diver
Aaron Krickstein (born 1967), tennis player, world # 6
Steve Morrison, NFL linebacker, college football coach
Gabe Muoneke, professional basketball player
Veronica Pershina, figure skater, coach
Jeff Petry, NHL hockey player
Emily Samuelson, figure skater
Jennifer Song, professional golfer
James Toney, world champion professional boxer
Austin Watson, professional ice hockey player
Alan Webb, professional track athlete
Charlie White, ice dancer, figure skater, 2014 Olympic gold medalist
Fielding H. Yost (1871–1946), football coach
 Jason Zucker (born 1992), NHL hockey player

Authors

Katherine Applegate, young adult and children's fiction writer
Clara Doty Bates, author
Charles Baxter, novelist
T. Casey Brennan, comic book author
Anne Carson, poet
Emily Colas, novelist
Nicholas Delbanco, novelist
Dorothy Marie Donnelly, poet
Donald Dunbar, poet
Loren D. Estleman, mystery and western novelist
Elizabeth Farrand, author and librarian
James Hynes, novelist
Laura Kasischke, novelist, poet
George Kao, author, translator
Elizabeth Kostova, novelist
Lillian Li, author 
Bruce McConkie (1915–1985), Mormon theologian, poet
Elizabeth Meriwether, writer, producer
Angel Nafis, poet
Davi Napoleon, drama critic, theatre historian
Andrea Phillips, author, game designer
John Pollack, author, presidential speechwriter
Ann Purmell, children's book author
Davy Rothbart, author, filmmaker, journalist
Mike Rother, author on industrial management
Allan Seager (1906–1968), novelist, short story writer
Alfred Slote, children's author
Sarah Weeks, children's author
Nancy Willard, children's author

Educators

Henry Carter Adams (1851–1921), economist
Akhil Amar, legal scholar
James Burrill Angell (1829–1916), journalist, diplomat, University of Michigan president
Allen Britton (1914–2003), music educator, dean, UM School of Music
Theodore V. Buttrey (1929–2018), classicist
Carl Cohen, philosopher, activist
Charles Cooley (1864–1929), sociologist 
Richard Crawford, music historian
John H. D'Arms (1934–2002), classicist
John Dewey (1859–1952), educational philosopher, reformer
Dag Øistein Endsjø, Norwegian scholar of religion
Sidney Fine (1920–2009), historian
Ben Finegold, chess Grandmaster
Robben Fleming (1916–2010), UM president
David Noel Freedman (1922–2008), biblical scholar
Harlan Hatcher (1898–1998), UM president
H. Wiley Hitchcock (1923–2007), musicologist
Catharine MacKinnon, feminist legal scholar
Mary Beth Norton, historian
Kenneth Lee Pike (1912–2000), linguist
Alvin Plantinga (born 1932), philosopher
Shael Polakow-Suransky, deputy chancellor, New York City Public Schools
Michael Porter (born 1947), economist
Martha Farnsworth Riche, economist
Michelle Rhee (born 1969), educator, activist
Wilfrid Sellars (1912–1989), philosopher
Harold Shapiro, economist, UM president
Henry Philip Tappan (1805–1881), first UM president
Claude H. Van Tyne (1869–1930), historian
Robert M. Warner (1927–2007), archivist of the United States, dean, UM School of Library Science
Glenn Watkins, musicologist
Leslie White (1900–1975), anthropologist
Letty M. Wickliffe (1902–2001), special education director in Indianapolis
Raymond Louis Wilder (1896–1982), mathematician

Entertainment

Robert Ashley, composer of television operas
Ken Burns, documentary filmmaker
Areeya Chumsai, model, filmmaker
Andrew Cohn, documentary filmmaker
Jack Falahee, actor, How To Get Away With Murder
Nicole Forester, actress
Megan Ganz, comedy writer, producer
David S. Goyer, filmmaker
Grace Henderson (1860–1944), stage and silent film actress
Gary Hutzel, visual effects supervisor
Michael Kosta, stand-up comedian and correspondent on The Daily Show
Lisa Kron, actress, playwright
Austin Nichols, actor
Lara Phillips, film and television actress
Anna Rose Kessler Moore, singer-songwriter
Michael Schur, television producer, writer, and actor
Kristina and Karissa Shannon, Playboy models
Martha Vickers (1925–1971), actress; wife of Mickey Rooney
Grace Lee Whitney (1930–2015), actress, Star Trek

Entrepreneurs and business figures

Tom and Louis Borders, founders of Borders Group
Jim Buckmaster, CEO of Craigslist
Bill Hewlett (1913–2001), engineer, co-founder of Hewlett-Packard
Bruce Iglauer, founder of Alligator Records
John and Thomas Knoll, creators of Adobe Photoshop
Tom Monaghan (born 1937), founder of Domino's Pizza, former Detroit Tigers owner
Eugene Power (1905–1988), microfilming and micropublishing pioneer
Jeff Shell (born 1965), CEO of NBCUniversal

Journalists, media figures

Jill Carroll, journalist, kidnapped in Iraq
Keith Gave, journalist, sportswriter
Charles J. Guiteau, writer and lawyer; responsible for the assassination of James A. Garfield
Reed Hundt, Federal Communications Commission chair
Ken Kelley (journalist), journalist, editor, and publisher
Jay Nordlinger, conservative political columnist
John Pollack, journalist, speech writer
Monika Samtani, broadcast journalist
Mike Tirico, sportscaster, Monday Night Football
Neda Ulaby, public radio correspondent
David Westin, media CEO

Luthiers

Gregg Alf, violin maker
Joseph Curtin, violin maker

Musicians and music groups

William Albright (1944–1998), composer, pianist
Katherine Anderson, singer
Robert Ashley (1930–2014), composer, audio synthesis pioneer
Ayo & Teo, music duo
Leslie Bassett (1923–2016), composer
Chris Bathgate, singer-songwriter
Eve Beglarian, composer
William Bolcom, pianist, composer
Muruga Booker, percussionist
Brownsville Station, rock group
Chenille Sisters, folk group
Commander Cody and His Lost Planet Airmen, formed in Ann Arbor
Lewis Hugh Cooper (1920–2007), bassoonist
Max Crook, rock musician
Dabrye (Tadd Mullinix), electronic dance musician
Damien Done, post-punk / gothic rock band, formed in Florida - relocated to Ann Arbor in 2006
James Dapogny, pianist, jazz scholar
Disco D (1980–2007), record producer, composer
Elephante (Tim Wu), DJ, musician, producer
Ross Lee Finney (1906–1997), composer
Tony Fontane (1925–1974), gospel singer-songwriter, actor
Frontier Ruckus, indie folk, alt-country band
Sameer Gadhia, singer, Young the Giant
Robert Glasgow (1925–2008), organist
Laurel Halo, electronic musician, composer
Mayer Hawthorne, singer-songwriter and musician
Deon Jackson, soul singer-songwriter
Eva Jessye (1895–1992), choral director, composer
James Kibbie, organist
Lyndon Lawless, conductor, music educator
Eva Likova (1919–2004), operatic soprano
Marilyn Mason (1925–2019), organist
Roger, Ben, and Larry Miller
Scott Morgan, rock musician
Joan Morris, vocalist
Damien Moyal, singer and musician
Randy Napoleon, jazz guitarist
Nicholas Phan, opera singer
Pity Sex, indie rock band
Iggy Pop, front man, artist, and actor
William Revelli (1902–1994), band director
H. Robert Reynolds, band director
Samiyam, hip-hop producer
Bob Seger, rock and roll singer-songwriter
Shigeto, electronic musician
Dick Siegel, jazz guitarist
Donald Sinta, saxophonist
Tom Smith, filk musician
Kate Soper, composer
Steven Springer, guitarist, songwriter
SRC, rock band
Colin Stetson, musician, composer
Tally Hall, indie rock band
Taproot, alt-rock band
Deniz Tek, guitarist with Australian rock band Radio Birdman
Vulfpeck, funk group
Andrew W.K., singing-songwriter, television host
We Are the Union, ska punk band
Ben Wilson, keyboard player in Blues Traveler
George Balch Wilson, composer
Wolf Eyes, industrial rock band
"Shakey Jake" Woods (1925–2007), street musician
Jeff Young, guitarist in Megadeth
Bryan Devendorf, drummer for the Grammy Winning Alternative rock band, The National.

Politicians

John Allen (died 1851), co-founder of Ann Arbor, attorney, state senator 
Bruce Bartlett, historian, political adviser 
Louis D. Belcher, mayor
Elizabeth Brater, state senator
Barbara Everitt Bryant (1926–2023), first woman to lead the US Census Bureau
Jane L. Campbell, mayor of Cleveland Ohio
Thomas M. Cooley (1824–1898), chief justice, Michigan Supreme Court
Samuel J. Eldersveld (1917–2010), political scientist, mayor
Marilyn L. Huff, judge
James Kingsley (1797–1878), attorney, state legislator, mayor
Chris Kolb, state legislator, first openly gay member of the Michigan legislature
Edwin Lawrence (1808–1885), Michigan jurist and state representative
William S. Maynard (1802–1866), merchant, land developer, mayor
Mike Nahan, Australian politician
Robert D. Orr (1917–2004), governor of Indiana
Edward C. Pierce (1930–2002), physician, mayor of Ann Arbor
Elisha Rumsey (1785–1827), co-founder of Ann Arbor
Brian Schatz, U.S. Senator from Hawaii
Ingrid Sheldon, mayor, 1993–2000
Benjamin Sherman, Wisconsin State Assemblyman and Senator
Neil Staebler (1905–2000), congressman, Democratic politician
L. D. Taylor (1857–1946), mayor of Vancouver
Albert H. Wheeler (1915–1994), microbiologist, first African American mayor of Ann Arbor

Scientists

Eric Betzig, physicist, Nobel laureate
Richard Crandall, physicist, computer scientist
Kazimierz Fajans (1887–1975), physical chemist
John H. Hubbell (1925–2007), radiation physicist 
Emmett Leith (1927–2005), electrical engineer, co-inventor of holography
Deirdre McCloskey, economist
James V. Neel (1915–2000), geneticist
Anatol Rapoport (1911–2007), mathematical psychologist
Elizabeth S. Russell, biologist
Annette Salmeen, biochemist, Rhodes Scholar, Olympic gold medalist
John Martin Schaeberle (1853–1924), astronomer
Gene Sperling, economic advisor
Jean Tatlock, psychiatrist, physician
Samuel Ting, physicist, Nobel laureate
James Craig Watson (1838–1880), astronomer
Thomas Huckle Weller (1915–2008), virologist, Nobel laureate
Henry F. Vaughan, epidemiologist and founder of University of Michigan School of Public Health

See also
List of University of Michigan alumni

References

 
Ann Arbor
Ann Arbor